Lycaenopsis minima, the tiny hedge blue, is a small butterfly found in India that belongs to the lycaenids or blues family.

Range
It is found from Manipur in India to the Dawna Hills of Myanmar.

See also
List of butterflies of India
List of butterflies of India (Lycaenidae)

Cited references

References
 
 

Lycaenopsis
Butterflies of Asia